Ribhan (रिभान, transcribed also as "'Reevan'" and "'Rivan'") is a village and Village Development Committee  in Kaski District in the Gandaki Zone of northern-central Nepal. At the time of the 2001 Nepal census it had a population of 1,617 persons living in 372 individual households. Brahmin and Gurung are main ethnic groups in this village. Ribhan is mainly in the bank of Mardi river which is main source of irrigation for people of this agriculture-based village. The forest in this village has many endangered species such as Himali red panda and leopard. Much of its forest is still unexplored as it is very remote with high hills and sometimes snow. It is a part of Annapurna Conservation Area project .

References

External links
UN map of the municipalities of Kaski District

Populated places in Kaski District